The Hinson Mounds (8Cr180) comprise an archeological site in Collier County, Florida near Miles City. It is located three miles northeast of Miles City. The mounds were estimated to have been used for burial from 400 - 900 AD, and they were part of the Glades culture.  Excavation of the mounds, which were found on a hardwood hammock island, has produced evidence of prehistoric Native American occupation.

On December 29, 1978, the site was added to the U.S. National Register of Historic Places.

References

External links
 Collier County listings at National Register of Historic Places
 Collier County listings at Florida's Office of Cultural and Historical Programs

See also
 List of burial mounds in the United States

Archaeological sites in Florida
National Register of Historic Places in Collier County, Florida
National Register of Historic Places in Big Cypress National Preserve
Mounds in Florida